Dolichothele diamantinensis also known as the Brazilian blue dwarf beauty tarantula, is a tarantula which was first described in 2009 by Rogério Bertani and Thiago dos Santos. As its common name aptly states it is found in Brazil and is a terrestrial tarantula. It was first originally described as Oligoxystre diamantinensis.

Description 
Females live 12 to 15 years, while males only live to 3. Their carapace is a blueish-greenish color, with a blue opisthosoma with long reddish hairs. The legs are a bright blue, white hairs covering these legs. Making it look similar to Chromatopelma cyaneopubescens, otherwise known as the Greenbottle Blue Tarantula.

Behavior 
They are quite heavy webbers, making intricate tunnels. They are very skittish, rarely striking a threat pose, though they may do so under persistent provocation. They are great display species, as they will usually be outside their tunnels, and although a new world species, they cannot throw urticating hairs.

References 

Theraphosidae
Spiders of South America
Spiders described in 2009